The Kawasaki KX250 is a 2-stroke motocross motorcycle that was first introduced in 1974. The 2-stroke KX-250 was discontinued from the 2008 model year. Many factors came into play with the demise of the 2 stroke models, however 2 strokes are once again becoming popular due to the costs associated with maintenance of the very complex workings of the 4 stroke design.

This bike has been ridden to several AMA Motocross Championship wins, including a number of titles, in the hands of Jeff Ward, Jeff Emig, and Ricky Carmichael.

The current KX250 has a four stroke engine, previously it had factory/model designation KX-F250.

KX250
Motorcycles introduced in 1974
Off-road motorcycles
Two-stroke motorcycles